The Judge Lee House in Watsonville, California is a Queen Anne style house built in 1894.  It was listed on the National Register of Historic Places in 1980.

It was designed by architect W. H. Weeks.

References

Houses on the National Register of Historic Places in California
Houses on the National Register of Historic Places in Santa Cruz County, California
Queen Anne architecture in California
Houses completed in 1894
Houses in Santa Cruz County, California
National Register of Historic Places in Santa Cruz County, California